John Trần Văn Nhàn (born February 6, 1966) is a Vietnamese-born prelate of the Catholic Church who has been serving as an auxiliary bishop in the Archdiocese of Atlanta in Georgia since 2022

Biography

Early life 
Trần Văn Nhàn was born in Vietnam on February 6, 1966, in the middle of the Vietnam War. His mother died in 1968, when she was mistaken for a Communist and shot, and his older brother was killed by a land mine. His family left South Vietnam as boat people when he was nine years old, eventually settling in New Orleans, Louisiana, after being rescued by an American ship.

Despite the poverty of his immigrant family, Tran attended a boarding school run by the Salesians of Don Bosco in Goshen, New York for high school. In 1989, he received a bachelor's degree from Saint Joseph Seminary College in Saint Benedict, Louisiana, and in 1992 completed his theological studies at Notre Dame Seminary in New Orleans.

Priesthood 
Tran was ordained to the priesthood on May 30, 1992. for the Archdiocese of New Orleans by Archbishop Francis B. Schulte.

After his ordination, Tran served as a vicar and pastor in various parishes throughout the archdiocese. His first assignment as a vicar was at  Our Lady of Lourdes Parish in Violet, Louisiana from 1992 to 1995, his first pastorate was at St. Louise de Marillac Parish in Arabi, Louisiana. from 2001 to 2003.  He served as pastor of Mary, Queen of Peace Parish in Mandeville, Louisiana since 2014 before being appointed a bishop.

He was a chaplain for the Saint Bernard parish sheriff's office at the time of Hurricane Katrina, and celebrated Mass for essential personnel and in parking lots and nursing homes in the wake of the disaster.

Tran additionally served on the priest personnel board and presbyteral council for the Archdiocese and is a Knight of Columbus, in addition to ministering to the local Vietnamese community, as he is fluent in Vietnamese as well as English.

Episcopacy 
Tran was appointed an auxiliary bishop of the Archdiocese of Atlanta and titular bishop of Tullia by Pope Francis on October 25, 2022.  Archbishop Gregory Hartmayer conferred the episcopal consecration on Tran on January 23, 2023.

See also

 Catholic Church hierarchy
 Catholic Church in the United States
 Historical list of the Catholic bishops of the United States
 List of Catholic bishops of the United States
 Lists of patriarchs, archbishops, and bishops

Notes

References

External links
 Roman Catholic Archdiocese of Atlanta Official Site
 Roman Catholic Archdiocese of New Orleans Official Site

1966 births
Living people
Vietnamese emigrants to the United States
American Roman Catholic priests